This list of the tallest buildings and structures in borough of Barrow-in-Furness ranks buildings in the city by height.

There are a diverse range of tall structures within the borough, the tallest of which being the wind farms of Ormonde Wind Farm, Walney Wind Farm and the Barrow Offshore Wind Farm. The industrial past of the town is the Roosecote Power Station and the Devonshire Dock Hall are also prominent structures. The tallest habitable building is the town hall at a height of 50 metres whilst the tallest office building is the 34 metre Craven House.

There are currently no further building or structures over 25 metres either under construction, approved or proposed for Barrow-in-Furness.



Completed

An equal sign (=) following a rank indicates the same height between two or more buildings.

Demolished

See also
 List of tallest buildings in the United Kingdom
 List of tallest buildings in Europe
 List of tallest buildings

References

 
Barrow-in-Furness
Barrow-in-Furnessh